A Waltzer is a flat fairground ride that often forms the centrepiece of traditional British and Irish fairs. The ride consists of a number of cars which spin freely while rotating around a central point, in much the same way as a carousel. As the cars revolve, the floor of the ride undulates over a track so that the cars rise and fall as the ride spins. The offset weight of the riders causes each car to rotate. The riders experience varying levels of g-force from the spinning of the car, and the rotation of the ride itself. Because of this, operators will impose height and age restrictions.

Operation 

The operator of the ride sits in the ‘paybox’ and makes the ride stop and start, and collects money from the staff who typically ride the platform and spin the cars by hand. Riders sit on the bench seat of the car and are held in place by a locking restraining bar.

Traditional Waltzer platforms are surrounded by a gangway, where would-be riders can stand and wait for their turn. This was often an important social aspect of fairs, especially for teenagers. Due to health and safety regulations, this is no longer permitted on British fairs.

In static amusement parks, there are often differences in the operation, such as an organised queue system and ride controls located away from the ride platform.

History and development 
The Waltzer was invented by Mr Dennis Jefferies of Congleton, Cheshire C1920. He originally named the ride "The Whirligig". The first passengers were his nieces, Phyllis and Dolly Booth. The Booth family retain the original drawings to this day. The manufacture of the ride was passed to Jackson's of Congleton.
The Waltzer is a variety of ‘Noah’s Ark ride’, a fairground ride first imported from Germany in 1930. Although an early Waltzer was made by Lakins for Thurston in 1933, the ride became strongly associated with the Scottish firm Maxwell and Sons of Musselburgh.

Waltzers originally had 10 cars. However, several Ark rides have been converted into a waltzer, therefore 9 and 11 car variations can be found. Some Waltzer cars had brakes that activate automatically when the safety bar is open. Newer models usually have a complex braking system that stops each car, making them face outwards automatically once the car is stationary.

Waltzers remain popular at travelling and small seaside funfairs, but are less common at static amusement parks.

The UK's largest theme park, Alton Towers, hosted a Waltzer as one of several new additions for the 2021 season.

See also 

Musik Express
Tilt a Whirl

References

Amusement rides
Amusement rides introduced in 1933
English inventions
6. 'Evening Sentinel' Stoke-on-Trent newspaper, Thursday 31st December 1953, page 7